The Baraboo Range is a syncline located in Columbia and Sauk Counties, Wisconsin. It consists of highly eroded Precambrian metamorphic rock. The Wisconsin River, previously traveling in a north to south direction, turns to the east just north of the range before making its turn to the west towards the Upper Mississippi River. The eastern end of the range was glaciated during the Wisconsinian glaciation, while the western half was not, and consequently, marks the eastern boundary of Wisconsin's Driftless Area.

The city of Baraboo is in the center of the valley. The range was designated a National Natural Landmark in 1980.

Geology
These hills were formed from deposited sediment in a shallow sea 1.7 billion years ago. This sediment was metamorphized into quartzite, deformed, then uplifted. These outcrops may have been islands when the region was covered by shallow seas in the Cambrian. The Baraboo River divides the range in half, flowing through Upper Narrows Gorge near Rock Springs and travels onto its confluence with the Wisconsin River downstream from Portage through the Lower Narrows. The Baraboos are composed of resistant Precambrian quartzite (a metamorphic rock) which has formed an erosional remnant or Monadnock, resulting in topographic prominence. The mountains may have formed as long ago as the late Precambrian. These formations were buried by Paleozoic sedimentary strata and are still being uncovered by the erosion of the softer, overlying rocks.

Devil's Lake, the centerpiece of Devil's Lake State Park, was formed from terminal moraines blocking access to its outlet, creating what is today an endorheic lake (i.e., a lake lacking a surface outlet to the world's oceans).

References

 Steven Dutch, Devil's Lake, Retrieved July 27, 2007 (With map) 
 Wisconsin Online, Retrieved July 27, 2007
 Baraboo Range Protection Plan, Sauk County, Retrieved July 27, 2007
 Devil's Lake State Park: Rocks and Water Through the Ages, Wisconsin Department of Natural Resources, Retrieved July 27, 2007
 Keith Montgomery, The Baraboo Ranges and Devil's Lake Gorge: A Geologic Tour  Retrieved April 30, 2019

External links 
 

Driftless Area
Landforms of Columbia County, Wisconsin
Landforms of Sauk County, Wisconsin
Geology of Wisconsin
Inselbergs of North America
Mountain ranges of Wisconsin
National Natural Landmarks in Wisconsin